Eriogonum gracillimum is a species of wild buckwheat known by the common name rose and white buckwheat. It is endemic to California but is common and widespread in many areas there. This is a spindly annual herb reaching anywhere from 5 to 50 centimeters in height. Most of the leaves are basal with a few scattered on the thin branched stem and are generally one to four centimeters long and somewhat woolly, with edges rolled under. Along the thread-thin branches of the stem appear small clusters of flowers which hang on short stalks in bell-shaped involucres. The two-millimeter-wide flowers are bright rose and white in color.

External links
Jepson Manual Treatment
Photo gallery

Flora of California
gracillimum
Flora without expected TNC conservation status